The Fiat 1 or Fiat 1 Fiacre was produced by Fiat from 1908 to 1910.

The four cylinders were for the first time in a single block, taking a cue from the Italian car manufacturer Aquila.

Around 1600 copies of the Fiacre were produced, intended for use as taxis. The model was sold in Italy and abroad. It was used in New York City, London, Paris and other cities.

In 1908 the Fiat Automobile Co was founded in the United States.

References 

1
Cars introduced in 1908
1910s cars
Brass Era vehicles